Galerkin may refer to:

 Boris Galerkin
 Galerkin method, a method for discretisation of continuous problems, named after Boris Galerkin